Mirjam Lydia Indermaur (born 1967) is a Swiss businesswoman and author. In 2019 she co-wrote the book Ich habe einen Knall - Sie auch? with her therapist, Denise Hürlimann, about her experience with psychotherapy.

Early life 
Indermaur was born in 1967 in Zug, Switzerland and is a member of the In der Maur family. She is a cousin of the poet Katherine Indermaur.

Career 
Indermaur works as a marketing specialist for her husband's technical trading company and is the chief executive officer of Comate, a marketing agency. She also runs a text design office and works as a marketing specialist for the electronic cigarette company Happy-Smoke, owned by her family.

Indermaur, who suffered from depression, began attending therapy with Denise Hürlimann, a trained psycho-oncologist and psychotherapist, after her husband was diagnosed with stomach cancer. After years of treatment with Hürlimann, Indermaur began recommending therapy to friends and colleagues. Indermaur and Hürlimann decided to co-write a book about their experiences working together as a therapist and patient in psychotherapy, which was published in 2019. The book, titled Ich habe einen Knall - Sie auch?, is a non-fiction memoir and guide book for psychotherapy.

Personal life 
Indermaur is married and has three children. She splits her time between homes in Obfelden, Switzerland, and Bonita Springs, Florida.

References 

Living people
1967 births
20th-century Swiss businesswomen
20th-century Swiss businesspeople
21st-century Swiss businesswomen
21st-century Swiss businesspeople
21st-century Swiss non-fiction writers
21st-century Swiss women writers
Mirjam
Marketing women
People from the canton of Zug
Swiss chief executives
Swiss people of German descent
Swiss medical writers
Swiss women non-fiction writers
Swiss writers in German